Live in the Square is singer-songwriter Patty Larkin's third album, recorded live at Sanders Theatre, Cambridge Massachusetts. Produced in 1990, it was her last album on Philo Records, it contained the following performances:

Track listing
 The Letter
 Time Was/Solo Flight
 Holbrook intro [speech]
 Metal Drums
 Had To Be (Deja Vu)
 Suburban Roots intro [spoken]
 I'm White
 Lately
 The Last Leviathan and Prelude
 Rescue Me
 Valentine
 Notes to Myself intro [spoken]
 Me
 Ruby (Like a Jewel)
 I'm Fine
 3 Amazing Vocalists intro [spoken]
 At the Mall

All songs were written by Patty Larkin except The Last Leviathan, written by Andy Barnes

Personnel
 Patty Larkin — vocals and acoustic guitar
 Richard Gates - bass guitar

References

Patty Larkin albums
Albums produced by Darleen Wilson
1990 live albums